A tram (called a streetcar or trolley in North America) is a rail vehicle that travels on tramway tracks on public urban streets; some include segments on segregated right-of-way. The tramlines or networks operated as public transport are called tramways or simply trams/streetcars. Many recently built tramways use the contemporary term light rail. The vehicles are called streetcars or trolleys (not to be confused with trolleybus) in North America and trams or tramcars elsewhere. The first two terms are often used interchangeably in the United States, with trolley being the preferred term in the eastern US and streetcar in the western US. Streetcar or tramway are preferred in Canada. In parts of the United States, internally powered buses made to resemble a streetcar are often referred to as "trolleys". To avoid further confusion with trolley buses, the American Public Transportation Association (APTA) refers to them as "trolley-replica buses". In the United States, the term tram has sometimes been used for rubber-tired trackless trains, which are unrelated to other kinds of trams.

Tram vehicles are usually lighter and shorter than main line and rapid transit trains. Today, most trams use electrical power, usually fed by a pantograph sliding on an overhead line; older systems may use a trolley pole or a bow collector. In some cases, a contact shoe on a third rail is used. If necessary, they may have dual power systems—electricity in city streets and diesel in more rural environments. Occasionally, trams also carry freight. Trams are now commonly included in the wider term "light rail", which also includes grade-separated systems. Some trams, known as tram-trains, may have segments that run on mainline railway tracks, similar to interurban systems. The differences between these modes of rail transport are often indistinct and a given system may combine multiple features.

Ultra Light Rail ULR trains are trams are a developing light weight rail type, around <5T/axle (empty), for use in smaller cities and towns to replace main bus routes e.g. Coventry Very Light Rail, ULR Partners future-light-rail or lower use branch train lines. They may be normal trams, rail motor sized and/or smaller modular units capable of platooning. They offer all the advantages of traditional trams but their lower weight, prefabricated beam type tracks offer the possibility of avoiding costly services diversions, lightweight OHL Over Head Lines and/or onboard power options e.g. hydrogen, biomethane, battery, may mean reduced/eliminated OHL. Thus installation costs may be lower than traditional trains and trams.

One of the advantages over earlier forms of transit was the low rolling resistance of metal wheels on steel rails, allowing the trams to haul a greater load for a given effort. Another factor which contributed to the rise of trams was the high total cost of ownership of horses. Electric trams largely replaced animal power in the late 19th and early 20th centuries. Improvements in other vehicles such as buses led to decline of trams in the mid 20th century. However, trams have seen resurgence in recent years. In 2014, the Aubagne tramway in Southern France became the first tram system in the world not to charge fares.

History

The history of trams, streetcars or trolley systems, began in the early nineteenth century. It can be divided into several distinct periods defined by the principal means of power used.

Horse-drawn

The world's first passenger train or tram was the Swansea and Mumbles Railway, in Wales, UK. The Mumbles Railway Act was passed by the British Parliament in 1804, and horse-drawn service started in 1807. The service closed in 1827, but was restarted in 1860, again using horses. It was worked by steam from 1877, and then, from 1929, by very large (106-seater) electric tramcars, until closure in 1960. The Swansea and Mumbles Railway was something of a one-off however, and no street tramway would appear in Britain until 1860 when one was built in Birkenhead by the American George Francis Train.

Street railways developed in America before Europe, largely due to the poor paving of the streets in American cities which made them unsuitable for horsebuses, which were then common on the well-paved streets of European cities. Running the horsecars on rails allowed for a much smoother ride. There are records of a street railway running in Baltimore as early as 1828, however the first authenticated streetcar in America, was the New York and Harlem Railroad developed by the Irish coach builder John Stephenson, in New York City which began service in the year 1832. The New York and Harlem Railroad's Fourth Avenue Line ran along the Bowery and Fourth Avenue in New York City. It was followed in 1835 by the New Orleans and Carrollton Railroad in New Orleans, Louisiana, which still operates as the St. Charles Streetcar Line. Other American cities did not follow until the 1850s, after which the "animal railway" became an increasingly common feature in the larger towns.

 
The first permanent tram line in continental Europe was opened in Paris in 1855 by Alphonse Loubat who had previously worked on American streetcar lines. The tram was developed in numerous cities of Europe (some of the most extensive systems were found in Berlin, Budapest, Birmingham, Saint Petersburg, Lisbon, London, Manchester, Paris, Kyiv).

The first tram in South America opened in 1858 in Santiago, Chile. The first trams in Australia opened in 1860 in Sydney. Africa's first tram service started in Alexandria on 8 January 1863. The first trams in Asia opened in 1869 in Batavia (now Jakarta), Netherlands East Indies (now Indonesia).

Problems with horsecars included the fact that any given animal could only work so many hours on a given day, had to be housed, groomed, fed and cared for day in and day out, and produced prodigious amounts of manure, which the streetcar company was charged with storing and then disposing of. Since a typical horse pulled a streetcar for about a dozen miles a day and worked for four or five hours, many systems needed ten or more horses in stable for each horsecar. In 1905 the British newspaper Newcastle Daily Chronicle reported that, "A large number of London's discarded horse tramcars have been sent to Lincolnshire where they are used as sleeping rooms for potato pickers".

Horsecars were largely replaced by electric-powered trams following the improvement of an overhead trolley system on trams for collecting electricity from overhead wires by Frank J. Sprague. His spring-loaded trolley pole used a wheel to travel along the wire. In late 1887 and early 1888, using his trolley system, Sprague installed the first successful large electric street railway system in Richmond, Virginia. Within a year, the economy of electric power had replaced more costly horsecars in many cities. By 1889, 110 electric railways incorporating Sprague's equipment had been begun or planned on several continents.

Horses continued to be used for light shunting well into the 20th century, and many large metropolitan lines lasted into the early 20th century. New York City had a regular horsecar service on the Bleecker Street Line until its closure in 1917. Pittsburgh, Pennsylvania, had its Sarah Street line drawn by horses until 1923. The last regular mule-drawn cars in the US ran in Sulphur Rock, Arkansas, until 1926 and were commemorated by a U.S. postage stamp issued in 1983. The last mule tram service in Mexico City ended in 1932, and a mule tram in Celaya, Mexico, survived until 1954. The last horse-drawn tram to be withdrawn from public service in the UK took passengers from Fintona railway station to Fintona Junction one mile away on the main Omagh to Enniskillen railway in Northern Ireland. The tram made its last journey on 30 September 1957 when the Omagh to Enniskillen line closed. The "van" now lies at the Ulster Transport Museum.

Horse-drawn trams still operate on the 1876-built Douglas Bay Horse Tramway in the Isle of Man, and at the 1894-built horse tram at Victor Harbor in South Australia. New horse-drawn systems have been established at the Hokkaidō Museum in Japan and also in Disneyland. A horse tram route in Polish gmina Mrozy, first built in 1902, was reopened in 2012.

Steam

The first mechanical trams were powered by steam. Generally, there were two types of steam tram. The first and most common had a small steam locomotive (called a tram engine in the UK) at the head of a line of one or more carriages, similar to a small train. Systems with such steam trams included Christchurch, New Zealand; Sydney, Australia; other city systems in New South Wales; Munich, Germany (from August 1883 on), British India (from 1885) and the Dublin & Blessington Steam Tramway (from 1888) in Ireland. Steam tramways also were used on the suburban tramway lines around Milan and Padua; the last Gamba de Legn ("Peg-Leg") tramway ran on the Milan-Magenta-Castano Primo route in late 1957.

The other style of steam tram had the steam engine in the body of the tram, referred to as a tram engine (UK) or steam dummy (US). The most notable system to adopt such trams was in Paris. French-designed steam trams also operated in Rockhampton, in the Australian state of Queensland between 1909 and 1939. Stockholm, Sweden, had a steam tram line at the island of Södermalm between 1887 and 1901.

Tram engines usually had modifications to make them suitable for street running in residential areas. The wheels, and other moving parts of the machinery, were usually enclosed for safety reasons and to make the engines quieter. Measures were often taken to prevent the engines from emitting visible smoke or steam. Usually the engines used coke rather than coal as fuel to avoid emitting smoke; condensers or superheating were used to avoid emitting visible steam. A major drawback of this style of tram was the limited space for the engine, so that these trams were usually underpowered. Steam tram engines faded out around the 1890s to 1900s, being replaced by electric trams.

Cable-hauled

Another motive system for trams was the cable car, which was pulled along a fixed track by a moving steel cable. The power to move the cable was normally provided at a "powerhouse" site a distance away from the actual vehicle. The London and Blackwall Railway, which opened for passengers in east London, England, in 1840 used such a system.

The first practical cable car line was tested in San Francisco, in 1873. Part of its success is attributed to the development of an effective and reliable cable grip mechanism, to grab and release the moving cable without damage. The second city to operate cable trams was Dunedin, from 1881 to 1957.

The most extensive cable system in the US was built in Chicago, having been built in stages between 1859 and 1892. New York City developed multiple cable car lines, that operated from 1883 to 1909. Los Angeles also had several cable car lines, including the Second Street Cable Railroad, which operated from 1885 to 1889, and the Temple Street Cable Railway, which operated from 1886 to 1898.

There were also two isolated cable lines in Sydney, New South Wales, Australia; the North Sydney line from 1886 to 1900, and the King Street line from 1892 to 1905.

In Dresden, Germany, in 1901 an elevated suspended cable car following the Eugen Langen one-railed floating tram system started operating. Cable cars operated on Highgate Hill in North London and Kennington to Brixton Hill in South London. They also worked around "Upper Douglas" in the Isle of Man from 1897 to 1929 (cable car 72/73 is the sole survivor of the fleet).

In Italy, in Trieste, the Trieste–Opicina tramway was opened in 1902, with the steepest section of the route being negotiated with the help of a funicular and its cables.

Cable cars suffered from high infrastructure costs, since an expensive system of cables, pulleys, stationary engines and lengthy underground vault structures beneath the rails had to be provided. They also required physical strength and skill to operate, and alert operators to avoid obstructions and other cable cars. The cable had to be disconnected ("dropped") at designated locations to allow the cars to coast by inertia, for example when crossing another cable line. The cable would then have to be "picked up" to resume progress, the whole operation requiring precise timing to avoid damage to the cable and the grip mechanism. Breaks and frays in the cable, which occurred frequently, required the complete cessation of services over a cable route while the cable was repaired. Due to overall wear, the entire length of cable (typically several kilometres) would have to be replaced on a regular schedule. After the development of reliable electrically powered trams, the costly high-maintenance cable car systems were rapidly replaced in most locations.

Cable cars remained especially effective in hilly cities, since their nondriven wheels would not lose traction as they climbed or descended a steep hill. The moving cable would physically pull the car up the hill at a steady pace, unlike a low-powered steam or horse-drawn car. Cable cars do have wheel brakes and track brakes, but the cable also helps restrain the car to going downhill at a constant speed. Performance in steep terrain partially explains the survival of cable cars in San Francisco.

The San Francisco cable cars, though significantly reduced in number, continue to perform a regular transportation function, in addition to being a well-known tourist attraction. A single cable line also survives in Wellington (rebuilt in 1979 as a funicular but still called the "Wellington Cable Car"). Another system, actually two separate cable lines with a shared power station in the middle, operates from the Welsh town of Llandudno up to the top of the Great Orme hill in North Wales, UK.

Gas
In the late 19th and early 20th centuries a number of systems in various parts of the world employed trams powered by gas, naphtha gas or coal gas in particular. Gas trams are known to have operated between Alphington and Clifton Hill in the northern suburbs of Melbourne, Australia (1886–1888); in Berlin and Dresden, Germany; in Estonia (1921–1951); between Jelenia Góra, Cieplice, and Sobieszów in Poland (from 1897); and in the UK at Lytham St Annes, Trafford Park, Manchester (1897–1908) and Neath, Wales (1896–1920).

On 29 December 1886 the Melbourne newspaper The Argus reprinted a report from the San Francisco Bulletin that Mr Noble had demonstrated a new 'motor car' for tramways 'with success'. The tramcar 'exactly similar in size, shape, and capacity to a cable grip car' had the 'motive power' of gas 'with which the reservoir is to be charged once a day at power stations by means of a rubber hose'. The car also carried an electricity generator for 'lighting up the tram and also for driving the engine on steep grades and effecting a start'.

Comparatively little has been published about gas trams. However, research on the subject was carried out for an article in the October 2011 edition of "The Times", the historical journal of the Australian Association of Timetable Collectors, now the Australian Timetable Association.

A tram system powered by compressed natural gas was due to open in Malaysia in 2012, but the news about the project appears to have dried up.

Electric

The world's first electric tram line operated in Sestroretsk near Saint Petersburg invented and tested by inventor Fyodor Pirotsky in 1875. Later, using a similar technology, Pirotsky put into service the first public electric tramway in St. Petersburg, which operated only during September 1880.
The second demonstrative tramway was presented by Siemens & Halske at the 1879 Berlin Industrial Exposition.
The first public electric tramway used for permanent service was the Gross-Lichterfelde tramway in Lichterfelde near Berlin in Germany, which opened in 1881. It was built by Werner von Siemens who contacted Pirotsky. This was world's first commercially successful electric tram. It initially drew current from the rails, with overhead wire being installed in 1883.

In Britain, Volk's Electric Railway was opened in 1883 in Brighton. Also in 1883, Mödling and Hinterbrühl Tram was opened near Vienna in Austria. It was the first tram in the world in regular service that was run with electricity served by an overhead line with pantograph current collectors. The Blackpool Tramway was opened in Blackpool, UK on 29 September 1885 using conduit collection along Blackpool Promenade. This system is still in operation in a modernised form.

The earliest tram system in Canada was built by John Joseph Wright, brother of the famous mining entrepreneur Whitaker Wright, in Toronto in 1883, introducing electric trams in 1892. In the US, multiple functioning experimental electric trams were exhibited at the 1884 World Cotton Centennial World's Fair in New Orleans, Louisiana, but they were not deemed good enough to replace the Lamm fireless engines then propelling the St. Charles Avenue Streetcar in that city. The first commercial installation of an electric streetcar in the United States was built in 1884 in Cleveland, Ohio and operated for a period of one year by the East Cleveland Street Railway Company. The first city-wide electric streetcar system, was implemented in 1886 in Montgomery, Alabama by the Capital City Street Railway Company, and ran for 50 years. 

In 1888, the Richmond Union Passenger Railway began to operate trams in Richmond, Virginia that  Frank J. Sprague had built. Sprague later developed multiple unit control, first demonstrated in Chicago in 1897, allowing multiple cars to be coupled together and operated by a single motorman. This gave rise to the modern subway train. Following the improvement of an overhead "trolley" system on streetcars for collecting electricity from overhead wires by Sprague, electric tram systems were rapidly adopted across the world.

Earlier electric trains proved difficult or unreliable and experienced limited success until the second half of the 1880s, when new types of current collectors were developed. Siemens' line, for example, provided power through a live rail and a return rail, like a model train, limiting the voltage that could be used, and delivering electric shocks to people and animals crossing the tracks. Siemens later designed his own version of overhead current collection, called the bow collector, and Thorold, Ontario, opened in 1887, and was considered quite successful at the time. While this line proved quite versatile as one of the earliest fully functional electric streetcar installations, it required horse-drawn support while climbing the Niagara Escarpment and for two months of the winter when hydroelectricity was not available. It continued in service in its original form into the 1950s.

Sidney Howe Short designed and produced the first electric motor that operated a streetcar without gears. The motor had its armature direct-connected to the streetcar's axle for the driving force. Short pioneered "use of a conduit system of concealed feed" thereby eliminating the necessity of overhead wire and a trolley pole for street cars and railways. While at the University of Denver he conducted important experiments which established that multiple unit powered cars were a better way to operate trains and trolleys.

Electric tramways spread to many European cities in the 1890s, such as Prague, Bohemia (then in the Austro-Hungarian Empire), in 1891; Kyiv, Ukraine, in 1892; Dresden, Germany, Lyon, France, and Milan and Genoa, Italy, in 1893; Rome, Italy, Plauen, Germany, Lviv, Ukraine, Belgrade, Serbia in 1894; Bristol, United Kingdom, Munich, in 1895; Bilbao, Spain, in 1896; Copenhagen, Denmark, and Vienna, Austria, in 1897; Florence and Turin, Italy, in 1898; Helsinki, Finland, and Madrid and Barcelona, Spain, in 1899. Sarajevo built a citywide system of electric trams in 1895. Budapest established its tramway system in 1887, and its ring line has grown to be the busiest tram line in Europe, with a tram running every 60 seconds at rush hour. Bucharest and Belgrade ran a regular service from 1894. Ljubljana introduced its tram system in 1901 – it closed in 1958. Oslo had the first tramway in Scandinavia, starting operation on 2 March 1894.

The first electric tramway in Australia was a Sprague system demonstrated at the 1888 Melbourne Centennial Exhibition in Melbourne; afterwards, this was installed as a commercial venture operating between the outer Melbourne suburb of Box Hill and the then tourist-oriented country town Doncaster from 1889 to 1896. As well, electric systems were built in Adelaide, Ballarat, Bendigo, Brisbane, Fremantle, Geelong, Hobart, Kalgoorlie, Launceston, Leonora, Newcastle, Perth, and Sydney. 

By the 1970s, the only full tramway system remaining in Australia was the Melbourne tram system. However, there were also a few single lines remaining elsewhere: the Glenelg tram line, connecting Adelaide to the beachside suburb of Glenelg, and tourist trams in the Victorian Goldfields cities of Bendigo and Ballarat. In recent years the Melbourne system, generally recognised as the largest urban tram network in the world, has been considerably modernised and expanded. The Adelaide line has also been extended to the Entertainment Centre, and work is progressing on further extensions. Sydney re-introduced trams (or light rail) on 31 August 1997. A completely new system, known as G:link, was introduced on the Gold Coast, Queensland on 20 July 2014. The Newcastle Light Rail opened in February 2019, while the Canberra light rail opened on 20 April 2019. This is the first time that there have been trams in Canberra, even though Walter Burley Griffin's 1914–1920 plans for the capital then in the planning stage did propose a Canberra tram system.

In Japan, the Kyoto Electric railroad was the first tram system, starting operation in 1895. By the 1960s the tram had generally died out in Japan.

Two rare but significant alternatives were conduit current collection, which was widely used in London, Washington, D.C. and New York City, and the surface contact collection method, used in Wolverhampton (the Lorain system), Torquay and Hastings in the UK (the Dolter stud system), and currently in Bordeaux, France (the ground-level power supply system). 

The convenience and economy of electricity resulted in its rapid adoption once the technical problems of production and transmission of electricity were solved. Electric trams largely replaced animal power and other forms of motive power including cable and steam, in the late 19th and early 20th centuries.

There is one particular hazard associated with trams powered from a trolley pole off an overhead line. Since the tram relies on contact with the rails for the current return path, a problem arises if the tram is derailed or (more usually) if it halts on a section of track that has been particularly heavily sanded by a previous tram, and the tram loses electrical contact with the rails. In this event, the underframe of the tram, by virtue of a circuit path through ancillary loads (such as interior lighting), is live at the full supply voltage, typically 600 volts DC. In British terminology, such a tram was said to be 'grounded'—not to be confused with the US English use of the term, which means the exact opposite. Any person stepping off the tram and completing the earth return circuit with their body could receive a serious electric shock. In such an event, the driver was required to jump off the tram (avoiding simultaneous contact with the tram and the ground) and pull down the trolley pole, before allowing passengers off the tram. Unless derailed, the tram could usually be recovered by running water down the running rails from a point higher than the tram, the water providing a conducting bridge between the tram and the rails.

In the 2000s, several companies introduced catenary-free designs. Alstom's Citadis line uses a third rail, Bombardier's PRIMOVE LRV is charged by contactless induction plates embedded in the trackway and CAF URBOS tram using ultracaps technology

Other power sources
In some places, other forms of power were used to power the tram.

Battery
 As early as 1834, Thomas Davenport, a Vermont blacksmith, had invented a battery-powered electric motor which he later patented. The following year he used it to operate a small model electric car on a short section of track four feet in diameter.

Attempts to use batteries as a source of electricity were made from the 1880s and 1890s, with unsuccessful trials conducted in among other places Bendigo and Adelaide in Australia, and for about 14 years as The Hague accutram of HTM in the Netherlands. The first trams in Bendigo, Australia, in 1892, were battery-powered, but within as little as three months they were replaced with horse-drawn trams. In New York City some minor lines also used storage batteries. Then, comparatively recently, during the 1950s, a longer battery-operated tramway line ran from Milan to Bergamo. In China there is a Nanjing battery Tram line and has been running since 2014. More recently in 2019, the West Midlands Metro in Birmingham, England, has adopted battery-powered trams on sections through the city centre close to Grade I listed Birmingham Town Hall.

Compressed air
Paris and Berne (Switzerland) operated trams that were powered by compressed air using the Mekarski system.
Trials on street tramways in Britain, including by the North Metropolitan Tramway Company between Kings Cross and Holloway, London  (1883), achieved acceptable results but were found not to be economic because of the combined coal consumption of the stationary compressor and the onboard steam boiler.

Human power

The Convict Tramway was hauled by human power in the form of convicts from the Port Arthur convict settlement. and was created to replace the hazardous sea voyage from Hobart to Port Arthur, Tasmania. Charles O'Hara Booth oversaw the construction of the tramway.

It opened in 1836 and ran for 8 km (5 miles) from Oakwood to Taranna. By most definitions, the tramway was the first passenger-carrying railway/tramway in Australia. An unconfirmed report says that it continued to Eaglehawk Neck and, if this was so, the length of the tramway would have been more than doubled. The tramway carried passengers and freight, and ran on wooden rails. The gauge is unknown. The date of closure is unknown, but it was certainly prior to 1877.

Hydrogen
In March 2015, China South Rail Corporation (CSR) demonstrated the world's first hydrogen fuel cell vehicle tramcar at an assembly facility in Qingdao. The chief engineer of the CSR subsidiary CSR Sifang Co Ltd., Liang Jianying, said that the company is studying how to reduce the running costs of the tram.

Hybrid
The Trieste–Opicina tramway in Trieste operates a hybrid funicular tramway system. Conventional electric trams are operated in street running and on reserved track for most of their route. However, on one steep segment of track, they are assisted by cable tractors, which push the trams uphill and act as brakes for the downhill run. For safety, the cable tractors are always deployed on the downhill side of the tram vehicle.

Similar systems were used elsewhere in the past, notably on the Queen Anne Counterbalance in Seattle and the Darling Street wharf line in Sydney.

Liquid fuel

Hastings and some other tramways, for example Stockholms Spårvägar in Sweden and some lines in Karachi, used petrol trams. Galveston Island Trolley in Texas operated diesel trams due to the city's hurricane-prone location, which would result in frequent damage to an electrical supply system.

Although Portland, Victoria promotes its tourist tram as being a cable car it actually operates using a hidden diesel motor. The tram, which runs on a circular route around the town of Portland, uses dummies and salons formerly used on the extensive Melbourne cable tramway system and now beautifully restored.

Modern development
In the mid-20th century many tram systems were disbanded, replaced by buses, trolleybuses, automobiles or rapid transit. The General Motors streetcar conspiracy was a case study of the decline of trams in the United States. In the 21st century, trams have been re-introduced in cities where they had been closed down for decades (such as Tramlink in London), or kept in heritage use (such as Spårväg City in Stockholm). Most trams made from the 1990s onwards (such as the Bombardier Flexity series and Alstom Citadis) are articulated low-floor trams with features such as regenerative braking.

Design

Trams have been used for two main purposes: for carrying passengers and for carrying cargo. There are several types of passenger tram:

 Articulated
 Cargo trams
 Double-Decker
 Drop-centre (or drop-center)
 Double ended and Single ended 
 Low-floor
 Rubber-tired
 Tram-train

Operation
 
There are two main types of tramways, the classic tramway built in the early 20th century with the tram system operating in mixed traffic, and the later type which is most often associated with the tram system having its own right of way. Tram systems that have their own right of way are often called light rail but this does not always hold true. Though these two systems differ in their operation, their equipment is much the same.

Controls
Trams were traditionally operated with separate levers for applying power and brakes. More modern vehicles use a locomotive-style controller which incorporate a dead man's switch. The success of the PCC streetcar had also seen trams use automobile-style foot controls allowing hands-free operation, particularly when the driver was responsible for fare collection.

Power supply

Electric trams use various devices to collect power from overhead lines. The most common device found today is the pantograph, while some older systems use trolley poles or bow collectors. Ground-level power supply has become a recent innovation. Another new technology uses supercapacitors; when an insulator at a track switch cuts off power from the tram for a short distance along the line, the tram can use energy stored in a large capacitor to drive the tram past the gap in the power feed. A rather obsolete system for power supply is conduit current collection.

The old tram systems in London, Manhattan (New York City), and Washington, D.C., used live rails, like those on third-rail electrified railways, but in a conduit underneath the road, from which they drew power through a plough. It was called Conduit current collection. Washington's was the last of these to close, in 1962. Today, no commercial tramway uses this system. More recently, a modern equivalent to these systems has been developed which allows for the safe installation of a third rail on city streets, which is known as surface current collection or ground-level power supply; the main example of this is the new tramway in Bordeaux.

Ground-level power supply

APS uses a third rail placed between the running rails, divided electrically into eight-metre powered segments with three-metre neutral sections between. Each tram has two power collection skates, next to which are antennas that send radio signals to energize the power rail segments as the tram passes over them.

Older systems required mechanical switching systems which were susceptible to environmental problems. At any one time no more than two consecutive segments under the tram should actually be live. Wireless and solid state switching remove the mechanical problem.

Alstom developed the system primarily to avoid intrusive power supply cables in the sensitive area of the old city of old Bordeaux.

Routes
Route patterns vary greatly among the world's tram systems, leading to different network topologies. 
 Most systems start by building up a strongly nucleated radial pattern of routes linking the city centre with residential suburbs and traffic hubs such as railway stations and hospitals, usually following main roads. Some of these, such as those in Hong Kong, Blackpool and Bergen, still essentially comprise a single route. Some suburbs may be served by loop lines connecting two adjacent radial roads. Some modern systems have started by reusing existing radial railway tracks, as in Nottingham and Birmingham, sometimes joining them together by a section of street track through the city centre, as in Manchester. Later developments often include tangential routes linking adjacent suburbs directly, or multiple routes through the town centre to avoid congestion (as in Manchester's Second City Crossing).
 Other new systems, particularly those in large cities which already have well-developed metro and suburban railway systems, such as London and Paris, have started by building isolated suburban lines feeding into railway or metro stations. In Paris these have then been linked by ring lines.
 A third, weakly nucleated, route pattern may grow up where a number of nearby small settlements are linked, such as in the coal-mining areas served by BOGESTRA or the Silesian Interurbans.
 A fourth starting point may be a loop in the city centre, sometimes called a downtown circulator, as in Portland or El Paso.
 Occasionally a modern tramway system may grow from a preserved heritage line, as in Stockholm.

The resulting route patterns are very different. Some have a rational structure, covering their catchment area as efficiently as possible, with new suburbs being planned with tramlines integral to their layout – such is the case in Amsterdam. Bordeaux and Montpellier have built comprehensive networks, based on radial routes with numerous interconnections, within the last two decades. Some systems serve only parts of their cities, with Berlin being the prime example, owing to the fact that trams survived the city's political division only in the Eastern part. Other systems have ended up with a rather random route map, for instance when some previous operating companies have ceased operation (as with the tramways vicinaux/buurtspoorwegen in Brussels) or where isolated outlying lines have been preserved (as on the eastern fringe of Berlin). In Rome, the remnant of the system comprises 3 isolated radial routes, not connecting in the ancient city centre, but linked by a ring route. Some apparently anomalous lines continue in operation where a new line would not on rational grounds be built, because it is much more costly to build a new line than continue operating an existing one.

In some places, the opportunity is taken when roads are being repaved to lay tramlines (though without erecting overhead cables) even though no service is immediately planned: such is the case in Leipzigerstraße in Berlin, the Haarlemmer Houttuinen in Amsterdam, and Botermarkt in Ghent.

Cross-border trams
Tram systems operate across national borders in Basel (from Switzerland into France and Germany), Geneva (from Switzerland into France) and Strasbourg (from France into Germany). A planned line linking Hasselt (Belgium) with Maastricht (Netherlands) was cancelled in June 2022.

Track

Tramway track can have different rail profiles to accommodate the various operating environments of the vehicle. They may be embedded into concrete for street-running operation, or use standard ballasted track with railroad ties on high-speed sections. A more ecological solution is to embed tracks into grass turf, an approach known as green track.

Tramway tracks use a grooved rail with a groove designed for tramway or railway track in pavement or grassed surfaces (grassed track or track in a lawn). The rail has the railhead on one side and the guard on the other. The guard provides accommodation for the flange. The guard carries no weight, but may act as a checkrail. Grooved rail was invented in 1852 by Alphonse Loubat, a French inventor who developed improvements in tram and rail equipment, and helped develop tram lines in New York City and Paris.  The invention of grooved rail enabled tramways to be laid without causing a nuisance to other road users, except unsuspecting cyclists, who could get their wheels caught in the groove.  The grooves may become filled with gravel and dirt (particularly if infrequently used or after a period of idleness) and need clearing from time to time, this being done by a "scrubber" tram.  Failure to clear the grooves can lead to a bumpy ride for the passengers, damage to either wheel or rail and possibly derailing.

In narrow situations double-track tram lines sometimes reduce to single track, or, to avoid switches, have the tracks interlaced, e.g. in the Leidsestraat in Amsterdam on three short stretches (see map detail); this is known as interlaced or gauntlet track. There is a UK example of interlaced track on the Tramlink, just west of Mitcham Station, where the formation is narrowed by an old landslip causing an obstruction. (See photo in Tramlink entry).

Track gauge

Historically, the track gauge has had considerable variations, with narrow gauge common in many early systems. However, most light rail systems are now standard gauge. An important advantage of standard gauge is that standard railway maintenance equipment can be used on it, rather than custom-built machinery. Using standard gauge also allows light rail vehicles to be delivered and relocated conveniently using freight railways and locomotives.

Another factor favoring standard gauge is that low-floor vehicles are becoming popular, and there is generally insufficient space for wheelchairs to move between the wheels in a narrow gauge layout. Standard gauge also enables – at least in theory – a larger choice of manufacturers and thus lower procurement costs for new vehicles. However, other factors such as electrification or loading gauge for which there is more variation may require costly custom built units regardless.

Tram stop

Tram stops may be similar to bus stops in design and use, particularly in street-running sections, where in some cases other vehicles are legally required to stop clear of the tram doors. Some stops may resemble to railway platforms, particularly in private right-of-way sections and where trams are boarded at standard railway platform height, as opposed to using steps at the doorway or low-floor trams.

Manufacturing
Approximately 5,000 new trams are manufactured each year. As of February 2017, 4,478 new trams were on order from their makers, with options being open for a further 1,092.

The main manufacturers are:

Debate

Advantages

 Trams (and road public transport in general) can be much more efficient in terms of road usage than cars – one vehicle replaces about 40 cars (which take up a far larger area of road space).
 Vehicles run more efficiently compared to similar vehicles that use rubber tyres, since the rolling resistance of steel on steel is lower than rubber on asphalt.
 Being guided by rails means that even very long tram units can navigate tight, winding city streets that are inaccessible to long buses.
 Tram vehicles are very durable, with some being in continuous revenue service for more than fifty years. This is especially true compared to internal combustion buses, which tend to require high amounts of maintenance and break down after less than 20 years, mostly due to the vibrations of the engine.
 In many cases tram networks have a higher capacity than similar buses. This has been cited as a reason for the replacement of one of Europe's busiest bus lines (with three-minute headways in peak times) with a tram by Dresdner Verkehrsbetriebe.
 Due to the above-mentioned capacity advantage, labor costs (which form the biggest share of operating costs of many public transit systems) per passenger can be significantly lower compared to buses.
 Trams and light rail systems can be cheaper to install than subways or other forms of heavy rail. In Berlin the commonly cited figure is that one kilometer of subway costs as much as ten kilometers of tramway.
 ULR Ultra Light Rail developments with prefabricated track and onboard power (no OHL Over Head Line) in the UK are aiming for £10 m per km as opposed to convention tram rail and OHL at £20-£30 m per km 
 Tramways can take advantage of old heavy rail alignments some examples include the Manchester Metrolink of which the Bury Line was part of the East Lancashire Railway. Other examples can be found in Paris, London, Boston, Melbourne and Sydney. They hence sometimes take advantage of high speed track while on train tracks.
As tram lines are permanent this allows local authorities to redevelop and revitalise their towns and cities provided suitable planning changes are made. Melbourne will allow higher buildings (5 to 6 story) along tram routes leaving the existing suburbs behind unchanged whilst doubling the cities density.
 The tram with its fixed route gives developers confidence to invest as opposed to a changeable bus route.
 Trams produce less air pollution than rubber tyred transport which produce tyre, asphalt and brake based pollutants. The use of regenerative electric motor braking in trams lowers mechanical brake use. Steel wheel and rail particulates are produced but regular wheel alignment and flexible track mounting can reduce emissions.
 Tram networks can link to other operational heavy rail and rapid transit systems, allowing vehicles to move directly from one to the other without passengers needing to alight. Trams that are compatible with heavy rail systems are called tram-trains, while those that can use subway tunnels are called pre-metro or Stadtbahn.
 Passengers can reach surface stations quicker than underground stations. Subjective safety at surface stations is often seen to be higher.
 Trams can be tourist attractions in ways buses usually aren't.
 Many modern tram systems plant low growing vegetation – mostly grasses – between the tracks which has a psychological effect on perceived noise levels and the benefits of greenspace. This is not possible for buses as they deviate too much from an "ideal" track in daily operations
 There is a well studied effect that the installation of a tram service – even if service frequency, speed and price all remain constant – leads to higher ridership and mode shift away from cars compared to buses. Conversely, the abandonment of tram service leads to measurable declines in ridership.

Disadvantages

 Installing rails for tram tracks and overhead lines for power means a higher up-front cost than using buses which require no modifications to streets to begin operations. 
 Tram tracks can be hazardous for cyclists, as bikes, particularly those with narrow tyres, may get their wheels caught in the track grooves. It is possible to close the grooves of the tracks on critical sections by rubber profiles that are pressed down by the wheelflanges of the passing tram but that cannot be lowered by the weight of a cyclist. If not well-maintained, however, these lose their effectiveness over time.
 When wet, tram tracks tend to become slippery and thus dangerous for bicycles and motorcycles, especially in traffic. In some cases, even cars can be affected.
 The opening of new tram and light rail systems has sometimes been accompanied by a marked increase in car accidents, as a result of drivers' unfamiliarity with the physics and geometry of trams. Though such increases may be temporary, long-term conflicts between motorists and light rail operations can be alleviated by segregating their respective rights-of-way and installing appropriate signage and warning systems.
 Rail transport can expose neighbouring populations to moderate levels of low-frequency noise. However, transportation planners use noise mitigation strategies to minimise these effects. Most of all, the potential for decreased private motor vehicle operations along the tram's service line because of the service provision could result in lower ambient noise levels than without.

By region

Trams are in a period of growth, with about 800 tram systems operating around the world, 10 or so new systems being opened each year, and many being gradually extended. Some of these systems date from the late 19th or early 20th centuries. In the past 20 years their numbers have been augmented by modern tramway or light rail systems in cities that had discarded this form of transport. There have also been some new tram systems in cities that never previously had them.

Tramways with tramcars (British English) or street railways with streetcars (North American English) were common throughout the industrialised world in the late 19th and early 20th centuries but they had disappeared from most British, Canadian, French and US cities by the mid-20th century.

By contrast, trams in parts of continental Europe continued to be used by many cities, although there were contractions in some countries, including the Netherlands.

Since 1980 trams have returned to favour in many places, partly because their tendency to dominate the roadway, formerly seen as a disadvantage, is now considered to be a merit since it raises the visibility of public transport (encouraging car users to change their mode of travel), and enables streets to be reconfigured to give more space to pedestrians, making cites more pleasant places to live. New systems have been built in the United States, United Kingdom, Ireland, Italy, France, Australia and many other countries.

In Milan, Italy, the old "Ventotto" trams are considered by its inhabitants a "symbol" of the city. The same can be said of trams in Melbourne in general, but particularly the iconic W class. The Toronto streetcar system had similarly become an iconic symbol of the city, operating the largest network in the Americas as well as the only large-scale tram system in Canada (not including light rail systems, or heritage lines).

Major tram and light rail systems

Current systems

The largest tram (classic tram, streetcar, straßenbahn) and fast tram (light rail, stadtbahn) networks in the world by route length (as of 2016) are:

 Melbourne 
 Saint Petersburg
 Cologne 
 Berlin 
 Moscow 
 Milan 
 Budapest
 Katowice agglomeration
 Vienna.

Other large transit networks that operate streetcar and light rail systems include:

 Dallas Light Rail, modern streetcar and heritage streetcar
 Sofia 
Warsaw
 Leipzig 
 Brussels
 Łódź
Bucharest 
Prague 
Dresden
Los Angeles

Statistics

 Tram and light rail systems operate in 388 cities across the world, 206 of which are in Europe;
 The longest single tram line and route in the world is the  interurban Belgian Coast Tram (Kusttram), which runs almost the entire length of the Belgian coast. Another fairly long interurban line is the Valley Metro Rail in agglomeration of Phoenix, Arizona, with its . World's longest urban (intracity) tram line is 33 km counter-ring routes 5/5a in Kazan (Tatarstan, Russia).
 
 Since 1985, 120 light rail systems have opened;
 Since 2000, 78 systems have opened while 13 have closed. The countries that have opened the most systems since 2000 are the USA (23), France (20), Spain (16), and Turkey (8);
 The longest systems are in Melbourne, Saint Petersburg, Katowice (Upper Silesian Industrial Region), Cologne, Berlin, Milan, Budapest, and Vienna.
 These lines have 32,345 stops at an average spacing of 484 metres;
 They carry 13.5 billion passengers a year, 3% of all public transport passengers. The highest-volume systems are Budapest (396 million passengers a year), Prague (372 m), Bucharest (322 m), Saint Petersburg (312 m), and Vienna (305 m);
 The most intensely used networks (passengers per km of, per year) are: Istanbul, Hong Kong, Tokyo and Sarajevo.
 Just over 36,000 trams and light rail vehicles are in operation. The largest fleets are in Moscow (919), Saint Petersburg (833), Prague (830), Budapest (612) and Warsaw (526);
 Between 1997 and 2014, 400–450 vehicles have been built per year.
 As of October 2015, Hong Kong has the world's only exclusively double-decker tramway system.
 The most intensively used junction in any tram network is the Lazarská x Spálená junction in Prague with appx. 150 vehicles passing through per hour.

Historical
 
However it was completely closed in 1938. The next largest system appears to have been , in Buenos Aires before 19 February 1963. Before its system started to be converted to trolleybus (and later bus) services in the 1930s (last tramway closed 6 July 1952), the first-generation London network had  of route in 1931. The final line, the Santa Teresa route was closed in 1968. Vienna in 1960 had , before the expansion of bus services and the opening of a subway (1976). Substituting subway services for tram routes continues.  was in Minneapolis-Saint Paul in 1947: There streetcars ended 31 October 1953 in Minneapolis and 19 June 1954 in St. Paul. The Sydney tram network, before it was closed on 25 February 1961, had  of route, and was thus the largest in Australia. As from 1961, the Melbourne system (currently recognised as the world's largest) took over Sydney's title as the largest network in Australia.

Africa

Asia

 Tramway systems were well established in the Asian region at the start of the 20th century but started a steady decline during the mid to late 1930s. The 1960s marked the end of its dominance in public transportation with most major systems closed and the equipment and rails sold for scrap; however, some extensive original systems still remain in service in Japan. In recent years there has been renewed interest in the tram with modern systems being built in Japan and China.

 Tram services in China exists in several cities during the 20th century; however, by the end of the century, only the systems in Dalian, Hong Kong and Changchun remained extant. However, the 21st century has seen a resurgence in the development of tram transport as China struggles with urban traffic congestion and pollution with at least 15 systems operating. Hong Kong has an exclusive fleet of double-decker trams. As of 2019, Wuyishan, Baoshan, Jiaxing and Haikou have new tram systems under construction.
 The first Japanese tram line was inaugurated in 1895 as the Kyoto Electric Railroad. The tram reached its zenith in 1932 when 82 rail companies operated 1,479 kilometres of track in 65 cities. The tram declined in popularity through the remaining years of the 1930s and during the 1960s many of the remaining operational tramways were shut down or converted into commuter railway lines.

 In India, the tram service in Kolkata is the only active service, with a gauge up to 30 km across the city. Trams were discontinued in Chennai in 1954 and in Mumbai in 1960. Tram service was started in 1884 in Karachi but was closed in 1975.
 The Northern and Central areas of the City of Colombo in Sri Lanka had an electric Tram Car system ( gauge). This system commenced operations about 1900 and was discontinued by 1960. However, a new tram system is in the process of being brought to Colombo as part of the plan of Western Region Megapolis.
 The 13-kilometre-long Jerusalem Light Rail system began operation in August 2011 and is currently being extended, with the full system expected to be in operation by 2023. A significant portion of it will be underground. A light rail system for Beersheba is also currently planned.
In Thailand, an extensive tram system ran in Bangkok from 1888, until it was suspended in 1968. A smaller single-route tram route tram in Lopburi was also suspended in the early 1960s.
 Other countries with discontinued tram systems include Indonesia, Singapore, Malaysia, Pakistan, Philippines, and Vietnam.
 However, a tram system is planned for construction in Gwadar, Pakistan where construction started in late 2011. 
 Trams are also under construction in DHA City, Karachi.
Several Tram systems are under construction and proposal in Taiwan, Mostly in Kaohsiung (Phase III) and Taipei (New Taipei City). The First LRT system was established in Kaohsiung (Circular LRT), followed by the Danhai Light Rail Transit in Northern Taiwan.

Indonesia 

 In Batavia (now Jakarta), the capital of the former Dutch colony of the Netherlands East Indies, a horse tram service started in 1869. A steam tram ran from 1881, and electrification followed in 1897. All Jakarta trams were discontinued in the 1960s by an independent Indonesia due to pressure from Sukarno, which saw tram network as "antiquated" and a "relic of [the] colonial era". The other cities in Indonesia who used to have urban tram network were Surabaya and Semarang.
 The Semarang tram network was constructed between 1882 and 1883, and it was essentially an inner suburb extension of the Samarang Joana Railway (SJS) network. The company already had an extensive rural tram network to the east of Semarang. Unfortunately, due to financial difficulties that hampered the SJS railway company, the Semarang tram network was closed down in 1940 (despite public protest in Semarang) and their rolling stock transferred to the Surabaya tram network.
 Surabaya's tram network was first built in 1886. Initially consisting of steam trams only, later electric trams were added in 1923. They served Surabaya commuters well into the independence era. The electric tram bowed out from service in 1968, while its steam counterpart outlived the electrics before they too bowed out from service in 1978, making it the very last urban steam tram service in the world to go out of service.
 In 2012, there was talk of reviving Surabaya's tram network as a part of Surabaya Mass Rapid Transit project, which will see parts of the old electric tram right of way reactivated, and it will be combined with the future monorail network. The project is aimed to alleviate Surabaya's traffic congestion and provide cheap public transportation for Surabaya commuters. In 2014, the project entered the tender phase.

Europe

In many European cities, much tramway infrastructure was lost in the mid-20th century, though not always on the same scale as in other parts of the world such as North America. Most of Central and Eastern Europe retained the majority of its tramway systems and it is here that the largest and busiest tram systems in the world are found.

Urban public transportation has been experiencing a sustained revival since the 1990s. Many European cities are rehabilitating, upgrading, expanding and reconstructing their old tramway lines and building new tramway lines.

North America

In North America, these vehicles are called "streetcars" (or "trolleys" in parts of the United States); the term tram is more likely to be understood as an aerial tramway or a people-mover, though "tram" may be used colloquially in Canada. Streetcar systems were developed in late 19th to early 20th centuries in a number of cities throughout North America. However, most North American cities saw their streetcar lines removed in the mid-20th century for a variety of financial, technological and social reasons. Exceptions included Boston, Cleveland, Mexico City, New Orleans, Newark, Philadelphia, Pittsburgh, San Francisco, and Toronto.

Canada 

Toronto currently operates the largest streetcar system in the Americas in terms of track length and ridership. Operated by the Toronto Transit Commission, the system consists of both street-running and grade-separated tramways. The streetcar system was established in 1861, and used a variety of vehicles in its history, including horse-drawn streetcars, Peter Witt streetcars, the PCC streetcar, and the Canadian Light Rail Vehicle and its articulated counterpart, the Articulated Light Rail Vehicle. Since 29 December 2019, the system exclusively uses the Flexity Outlook made by Bombardier Transportation.

Streetcars once existed in the Canadian cities of Calgary, Edmonton, Halifax, Hamilton, Kingston, Kitchener, London, Montreal, Ottawa, Peterborough, Quebec City, Regina, Saskatoon, Windsor, Winnipeg, and Vancouver. However, Canadian cities excluding Toronto, removed their streetcar systems in the mid-20th century. In the late 1970s and early 1980s, light rail systems were introduced in Calgary and Edmonton; with another light rail system established in Ottawa in 2001. There is now something of a renaissance for light railways in mid-sized cities with Waterloo, Ontario the first to come on line and construction underway in Mississauga, Ontario and Hamilton, Ontario. In the late 20th century, several Canadian locales restored portions of their defunct streetcar lines, operating them as a heritage feature for tourists. Heritage streetcar lines in Canada include the High Level Bridge Streetcar in Edmonton, the Nelson Electric Tramway in Nelson, and the Whitehorse Waterfront Trolley in Whitehorse.

United States 

Pittsburgh had kept most of its streetcar system serving the city and many suburbs, making it the longest-lasting large-network streetcar system in the United States. However, most of the city's streetcar lines had been abandoned by the early 1970s, and the handful of surviving streetcar lines were converted to light rail in the 1980s. San Francisco's Muni Metro system is the largest surviving streetcar system in the United States, and has even revived previously closed streetcar lines such as the F Market & Wharves heritage streetcar line. In the late 20th century, several cities installed modern light rail systems, in part along the same corridors as their old streetcars systems, the first of these being the San Diego Trolley in San Diego in 1981.

In the 1980s, some cities in the United States brought back streetcars lines, including Memphis, Tampa, and Little Rock; However, these streetcar systems were designed as heritage streetcar lines, and used vintage or replica-vintage vehicles. The first "second-generation streetcar systems" in North America was opened in Portland in 2001. The "second-generation streetcar system," utilizes modern vehicles – vehicles that feature low-floor streetcars. These newer streetcar systems were built in several American cities in the early 21st century including Atlanta, Charlotte, Cincinnati, Dallas, Detroit, Kansas City, Milwaukee, Oklahoma City, Seattle, Tucson, and Washington, D.C.

Oceania

Australia 
 Historically, there have been trams in the following Australian cities and towns: Adelaide, Ballarat, Bendigo, Brisbane, Broken Hill, Derby,  Fremantle, Gawler, Geelong, Hobart, Kalgoorlie, Launceston, Leonora, Maitland, Melbourne, Moonta–Wallaroo, Newcastle, Perth, Rockhampton, Sorrento, Sydney and Victor Harbor. They ranged from extensive systems to single lines. Virtually all known types of motive power have been utilised in Australia at some stage.
 The Sydney system, which closed in 1961, was the most extensive and the largest passenger carrier of any Australian public transport system then or since, moving over 400 million passengers per annum, at its peak. In 1997, Sydney reintroduced tram services on a modern light rail network; the 2010s saw a significant expansion of the network.
 Trams were retained in Melbourne (by length, the world's largest system) and, to a lesser extent, Adelaide. All other cities had largely dismantled their networks by the 1970s. 
 Ballarat and Bendigo have retained some trams as heritage vehicles operating on limited trackage. In 2008 and 2009, Bendigo trialled using its heritage trams for regular public transport, but the service was too infrequent to be useful for that. 
 Portland, Victoria, introduced a tourist tram line in 1996, which uses two replicas of a Melbourne cable tram grip car or dummy, driven by a concealed diesel motor, and two restored trailer cars. 
 A completely new tram system opened on the Gold Coast on 20 July 2014, with a major extension completed in December 2017. The new system is known as the G:link and is the first tram/light rail system in the state of Queensland since Brisbane closed its tram network in 1969.

 The construction of light rail in Canberra became the major issue of the 2016 ACT election, with the governing coalition supporting the project and the opposition against it. The government was returned and Stage 1 of the light rail launched in April 2019.
 The railway into the centre of Newcastle was truncated at Wickham on 25 December 2014, and the railway line was replaced by the Newcastle Light Rail line in February 2019. 
 There are also tentative plans for new tram systems in Hobart and on the Sunshine Coast.

New Zealand 
 New Zealand's last public transport tramway system, that of Wellington, closed in 1966. 
 Nevertheless, there had been tramways ranging from large, comprehensive systems to single lines, in Auckland, Christchurch, Dunedin, Gisborne, Invercargill, Napier, New Plymouth, Greymouth, Westport, Hokitika, Ross, Brighton, Charleston, Kamiere and Kamara. 
 New Zealand's tram gauges were not standardised; the 15 systems used no less than five gauges, making swapping of rolling stock from system to system difficult. 
 Christchurch has subsequently reintroduced heritage trams over a new CBD route, but the overhead wiring plus some track was damaged by the earthquake of 2011. In November 2013, a limited circuit was reopened. 
 Auckland has recently introduced heritage trams into the Wynyard area, near the CBD, using former W-class Melbourne trams. On 9 May 2018, two modern tram/Light rail routes were announced from Wynyard Quarter, via Queen Street to Auckland Airport via Dominion Road and Onehunga in the South and via Queen Street and Great North Road, Point Chevalier and onto the Northwestern Motorway to Westgate to be running in the early 2020s with a possible further extension to Kumeu/Huapai. 
 Preserved Auckland trams from the Museum of Transport & Technology have made cameo appearances during Heritage Weeks. 
 Heritage lines exist at Auckland's Museum of Transport & Technology, the Wellington Tramway Museum at Queen Elizabeth Park on the Kapiti Coast, the Tramways Trust Wanganui and the Tramway Historical Society at Ferrymead in Christchurch, as well as the Christchurch Tramway Limited in the central city. 
 Whangarei Steam and Model Railway Club also run two former Lisbon trams formally from Aspen, Colorado.

South America

A new line, the PreMetro line E2 system feeding the Line E of the Buenos Aires Underground has been operating since 1987 on the outskirts of Buenos Aires.
 In Cuenca, Ecuador, a tram line started operating since March 2019 as the main public transportation system in the city. The L1 of the Cuenca tram is 20.4 km long with 20 stops and uses Alstom Citadis (302) trains.
 A historic tram line known as the Santa Teresa Tram operates in Rio de Janeiro, Brazil. In 2016, a new tram line started operating in Rio de Janeiro, known as the Light rail transportation system.
 The Tranvía del Este in Puerto Madero, Buenos Aires, operated from 2007 to 2012, and it is now dismantled.
 In Medellín, Colombia, a tram line began operation on 15 October 2015, as a revival of old Ayacucho tram.
 In Santiago, Chile there are plans for a tramway that will connect the comunes of Las Condes, Lo Barnechea y Vitacura. (tranvía de Las Condes)

Incidents

 In January 1864, well-known Anglo-Australian musician and composer Isaac Nathan was hit and killed by a Sydney horse tram when his clothing was caught in the door, whilst he was attempting to alight. Nathan is reputed to be one of the first tram fatalities in the Southern Hemisphere (many sources claim that it was the first such accident).
 On the morning of 18 August 1901, four masked men, described as "urban bushrangers", held up an eastbound horse tram in Riversdale Road, Melbourne, just past Power Street. For their trouble the men received £2 10/- in fares from driver Thomas Taylor, and £21 19/- from eight passengers. One passenger was injured. The bandits were never caught. Contemporary newspapers hypothesised that the bandits were after a specific commuter who travelled regularly on this particular tram and who was in the habit of carrying large amounts of cash.
 In the Tottenham Outrage in 1909, two armed robbers hijacked a tram and were chased by the police in another tram.
 On 7 June 1926 Catalan architect Antoni Gaudí was knocked down by a Barcelona tram and subsequently died.
 On 27 February 1930, Paul de Vivie (pen name Vélocio), godfather of the dérailleur was killed by a tram in St Étienne
 It is reputed that in the 1930s a murdered body was dragged out of the River Thames in London. The body had been stripped of anything that might have identified him. The only clue to the person's identity was a portion of a tram ticket hidden in the lining of his coat. The local police did not recognise the ticket but images in newspapers led to it being identified as a Melbourne tram ticket. Serendipitously, the serial number on the ticket was intact. Victoria Police in Melbourne, acting as agents for the Metropolitan Police in London, contacted the Melbourne & Metropolitan Tramways Board. From the serial number, the M&MTB were able to tell which tram depot had issued the ticket, on what day and on which specific tram, and in which section of a particular route (North Balwyn). Police then interviewed regular commuters and discovered the identity of a man whom, they believed, had recently travelled to London. This led to the arrest and conviction of the murderer. Decades after the event, the M&MTB were still citing the incident in training courses as a reason for tram conductors, etc., to keep proper and efficient records.

In popular culture

Tram modelling

Model trams are popular in HO scale (1:87) and O scale (1:48 in the US and generally 1:43,5 and 1:45 in Europe and Asia). They are typically powered and will accept plastic figures inside. Common manufacturers are Roco and Lima, with many custom models being made as well. The German firm Hödl and the Austrian Halling specialise in 1:87 scale.

In the US, Bachmann Industries is a mass supplier of HO streetcars and kits. Bowser Manufacturing has produced white metal models for over 50 years. There are many boutique vendors offering limited run epoxy and wood models. At the high end are highly detailed brass models which are usually imported from Japan or Korea and can cost in excess of $500. This scale/gauge hybrid is called OO scale.
O scale trams are also very popular among tram modellers because the increased size allows for more detail and easier crafting of overhead wiring. In the US these models are usually purchased in epoxy or wood kits and some as brass models. The Saint Petersburg Tram Company produces highly detailed polyurethane non-powered O Scale models from around the world which can easily be powered by trucks from vendors like Q-Car.

In the US, one of the best resources for model tram enthusiasts is the East Penn Traction Club of Philadelphia and Trolleyville a website of the Southern California Traction Club.

It is thought that the first example of a working model tramcar in the UK built by an amateur for fun was in 1929, when Frank E. Wilson created a replica of London County Council Tramways E class car 444 in 1:16 scale, which he demonstrated at an early Model Engineer Exhibition. Another of his models was London E/1 1800, which was the only tramway exhibit in the Faraday Memorial Exhibition of 1931. Together with likeminded friends, Frank Wilson went on to found the Tramway & Light Railway Society in 1938, establishing tramway modelling as a hobby.

Etymology and terminology
The English terms tram and tramway are derived from the Scots word , referring respectively to a type of truck (goods wagon or freight railroad car) used in coal mines and the tracks on which they ran. The word tram probably derived from Middle Flemish  ("beam, handle of a barrow, bar, rung"). The identical word  with the meaning "crossbeam" is also used in the French language. Etymologists believe that the word tram refers to the wooden beams the railway tracks were initially made of before the railroad pioneers switched to the much more wear-resistant tracks made of iron and, later, steel. The word Tram-car is attested from 1873.

Although the terms tram and tramway have been adopted by many languages, they are not used universally in English; North Americans prefer streetcar, trolley, or trolleycar. The term streetcar is first recorded in 1840, and originally referred to horsecars. When electrification came, Americans began to speak of trolleycars or later, trolleys. A widely held belief holds the word to derive from the troller (said to derive from the words traveler and roller), a four-wheeled device that was dragged along dual overhead wires by a cable that connected the troller to the top of the car and collected electrical power from the overhead wires; this portmanteau derivation is, however, most likely folk etymology. "Trolley" and variants refer to the verb troll, meaning "roll" and probably derived from Old French, and cognate uses of the word were well established for handcarts and horse drayage, as well as for nautical uses.

The alternative North American term 'trolley' may strictly speaking be considered incorrect, as the term can also be applied to cable cars, or conduit cars that instead draw power from an underground supply. Conventional diesel tourist buses decorated to look like streetcars are sometimes called trolleys in the US (tourist trolley). Furthering confusion, the term tram has instead been applied to open-sided, low-speed segmented vehicles on rubber tires generally used to ferry tourists short distances, for example on the Universal Studios backlot tour and, in many countries, as tourist transport to major destinations. The term may also apply to an aerial ropeway, e.g. the Roosevelt Island Tramway.

Although the use of the term trolley for tram was not adopted in Europe, the term was later associated with the trolleybus, a rubber-tired vehicle running on hard pavement, which draws its power from pairs of overhead wires. These electric buses, which use twin trolley poles, are also called trackless trolleys (particularly in the northeastern US), or sometimes simply trolleys (in the UK, as well as the Pacific Northwest, including Seattle, and Vancouver).

The New South Wales government in Australia has decided to use the term "light rail" for their trams.

See also

Tram models
See :Category:Tram vehicles

Trams by region

 Trams in Africa
 Trams in Australia
 Trams in New Zealand
 Streetcars in North America
 Trams in South America

Tram lists

 List of town tramway systems
 List of tram and light rail transit systems
 List of largest currently operating tram and light rail transit systems
 List of largest tram and light rail transit systems ever
 List of tram builders
 List of tram systems by gauge and electrification
 List of transport museums
 Tram and light rail transit systems

Other topics

 Armoured tram
 Capabus
 Cater MetroTrolley
 Dual-mode vehicle
 Light rail
 Minecart, also known as a tram
 Premetro
 Rail transport in Walt Disney Parks and Resorts
 Railway electrification system
 Rubber-tyred tram
 Stadtbahn
 Streetcar suburb
 Traction current pylon
 Tram stop
 Trams and roundabouts
 Trams in popular culture
 Worldwide examples of gauntlet tracks

References

Citations

General and cited references

Further reading

 
 
 
 Arrivetz, Jean. 1956. Les Tramways Français (No ISBN). Lyon: Editions Omni-Presse.
 Bett, W. C., and J. C. Gillam. 1962. Great British Tramway Networks (4th Edition), . London: Light Railway Transport League.
 Bigon, Liora. 2007, "Tracking Ethno-Cultural Differences: The Lagos Steam Tramway (1902–1933)" Journal of Historical Geography, 33, 3
 Brimson, Samuel. 1983. The Tramways of Australia. Sydney: Dreamweaver Books.
 Buckley, R. J. 1984. Tramways and Light Railways of Switzerland and Austria. Milton Keynes, UK: Light Rail Transit Association.
 Chandler, Allison. 1963. Trolley Through the Countryside (No ISBN). Denver: Sage Books.
 Cheape, Charles W. Moving the masses: urban public transit in New York, Boston, and Philadelphia, 1880–1912 (Harvard University Press, 1980)
 Davies, W. K. J. 1986. 100 years of the Belgian vicinal: SNCV/NMVB, 1885–1985: a century of secondary rail transport in Belgium. Broxbourne, UK: Light Rail Transit Association.
 Dunbar, Charles S. 1967.
 Dyer, Peter, and Peter Hodge. 1988. Cane Train: The Sugar-Cane Railways of Fiji. Wellington: New Zealand Railway and Locomotive Society Inc.
 Gragt, Frits van der. 1968. Europe's Greatest Tramway Network (No ISBN). Leiden, Netherlands: E.J. Brill.
 Hilton, George W. 1997. The Cable Car in America: A New Treatise upon Cable or Rope Traction As Applied to the Working of Street and Other Railways, Revised Edition. Stanford (CA), US: Stanford University Press.
 Howarth, W. Des. 1971. Tramway Systems of Southern Africa (No ISBN). Johannesburg: published by the author.
 King, B. R., and J. H. Price. 1995. The Tramways of Portugal (4th Edition). London: Light Rail Transit Association.
 McKay, John P.  Tramways and Trolleys: The Rise of Urban Mass Transport in Europe (1976)
 Middleton, William D. 1967. The Time of the Trolley. Milwaukee (WI), US: Kalmbach Publishing.
 Morrison, Allen. 1989. "The Tramways of Brazil: A 130-Year Survey". New York: Bonde Press.
 Morrison, Allen. 1992. The Tramways of Chile: 1858–1978. New York: Bonde Press.
 Morrison, Allen. 1996. Latin America by Streetcar: A Pictorial Survey of Urban Rail Transport South of the U.S.A.. New York: Bonde Press.
 Nye, David E.: Electrifying America : social meanings of a new technology, 1880–1940, MIT Press, Cambridge, Massachusetts c1990. 
 Pabst, Martin. 1989. Tram & Trolley in Africa. Krefeld: Röhr Verlag GMBH.
 Peschkes, Robert. World Gazetteer of Tram, Trolleybus, and Rapid Transit Systems.
Part One, Latin America. 1980. Exeter, UK: Quail Map Company.
Part Two, Asia+USSR / Africa / Australia. 1987. London: Rapid Transit Publications.
Part Three, Europe. 1993. London: Rapid Transit Publications.
Part Four, North America. 1998. London: Rapid Transit Publications.
 
 Röhr, Gustav. 1986. Schmalspurparadies Schweiz, Band 1: Berner Oberland, Jura, Westschweiz, Genfer See, Wallis. Aachen: Schweers + Wall.
 Rowsome, Frank; Stephan McGuire, tech. ed. (1956). A Trolley Car Treasury: A Century of American Streetcars—Horsecars, Cable Cars, Interurbans, and Trolleys. New York: McGraw-Hill.
 Schweers, Hans. 1988. Schmalspurparadies Schweiz, Band 2: Nordostschweiz, Mittelland, Zentralschweiz, Graubünden, Tessin. Aachen: Schweers + Wall.
 Stewart, Graham. 1985. When Trams Were Trumps in New Zealand. Wellington: Grantham House Publishing.
 Stewart, Graham. 1993 The End of the Penny Section (revised and enlarged edition). Wellington: Grantham House Publishing.
 Straßenbahnatlas ehem. Sowjetunion / Tramway Atlas of the former USSR. 1996. Berlin: Arbeitsgemeinschaft Blickpunkt Straßenbahn, in conjunction with Light Rail Transit Association, London.
 Straßenbahnatlas Rumänien (compiled by Andreas Günter, Sergei Tarknov and Christian Blank). 2004. Berlin: Arbeitsgemeinschaft Blickpunkt Straßenbahn.
 Tramway & Light Railway Atlas: Germany 1996. 1995. Berlin: Arbeitsgemeinschaft Blickpunkt Straßenbahn, in conjunction with Light Rail Transit Association, London.
 Turner, Kevin. 1996. The Directory of British Tramways: Every Passenger-Carrying Tramway, Past and Present. Somerset, UK: Haynes.
 Waller, Michael H., and Peter Walker. 1992. British & Irish Tramway Systems since 1945. Shepperton (Surrey), UK: Ian Allan Ltd.

External links

 
 
 The Elephant Will Never Forget (British Transport Films, 1953) showing changeover from conduit to overhead power
 Battery tram in Yucatan

 
 
Public transport
Sustainable transport
Russian inventions
Railcars
Road hazards